O. Henry House refers to two homes which the author, William Sydney Porter, better known as O. Henry lived. Both of these homes are located in Texas.

In Austin, Texas
William Sidney Porter House

In San Antonio, Texas
O. Henry House Museum (San Antonio)

Historic houses